Statistics of Swiss Super League in the 1949–50 season.

Overview
It was contested by 14 teams, and Servette FC Genève won the championship.

League standings

Results

Sources 
 Switzerland 1949–50 at RSSSF

Swiss Football League seasons
Swiss
Football